Fulton County Airport  is two miles east of Rochester, in Fulton County, Indiana. It is owned by the Fulton County Airport Authority (formerly the Fulton County Board of Aviation Commissioners).

Facilities
Its runway, 11/29, is 5,001 by 75 feet (1,524 x 23 m) asphalt.

In 2006 the airport had 10,097 aircraft operations, average 27 per day: 97% general aviation and 3% air taxi. Ten aircraft were then based at this airport: 90% single-engine and 10% helicopter.

References

External links 
 Aerial photo from Indiana Department of Transportation
 Aerial photo as of 11 April 1998 from USGS The National Map
 
 

Airports in Indiana
Transportation buildings and structures in Fulton County, Indiana